Peter Hewett Broadbridge, 3rd Baron Broadbridge (19 August 1938 – 6 February 2000), was a Deputy Speaker in the House of Lords from 1994 to 1999.

The son of Eric Broadbridge, 2nd Baron Broadbridge, he was educated at Hurstpierpoint College and St Catherine's College, Oxford.

Arms

References 

1938 births
2000 deaths
People educated at Hurstpierpoint College
Alumni of St Catherine's College, Oxford
Peter

Broadbridge